Lebanon competed at the 1968 Summer Olympics in Mexico City, Mexico. Eleven competitors, all men, took part in 13 events in 6 sports.

Cycling

1000m time trial
 Tarek Abou Al Dahab — 1:16.18 min (→ 32nd place)

Sprint
 Tarek Abou Al Dahab
 Round 1 — eliminated (→ did not advance)

Individual pursuit
 Tarek Abou Al Dahab
 Heats — 5:35.42 min (→ did not advance)

Individual road race
 Tarek Abou Al Dahab — DNF

Fencing

Three fencers represented Lebanon in 1968.

Men's foil
 Souheil Ayoub — defeated in first round

Men's épée
 Ali Chekr — defeated in first round
 Khalil Kallas — defeated in first round

Shooting

Three shooters represented Lebanon in 1968.

Trap
 Elias Salhab — 191 pts (→ 18th place)

Skeet
 Spiro Hayek — 180 pts (→ 39th place)
 Tanios Harb — 179 pts (→ 41st place)

Swimming

Men's 100 metres freestyle
 Yacoub Masboungi
 Heats — 1:00.5 min (→ 7th in heat, did not advance)

Men's 100 metres backstroke
 Yacoub Masboungi
 Heats — 1:11.6 min (→ 7th in heat, did not advance)

Weightlifting

Wrestling

Men's Greco-Roman bantamweight (57 kg)
 Jean Nakouzi
 Round 1 — fought Herbert Singerman of Canada
 Round 2 — fought Rodolfo Guerra of Mexico
 Round 3 — fought Arthur Spaenhoven of the Netherlands

Men's Greco-Roman heavyweight (97 kg)
 Hasan Bechara
 Round 1 — fought Petr Kment of Czechoslovakia
 Round 2 — fought Constantin Busoi of Romania

References

External links
Official Olympic Reports
Part Three: Results

Nations at the 1968 Summer Olympics
1968
1968 in Lebanese sport